The Ayamaru is a ethnic group who inhabits Southwest Papua, precisely in the west and south of Lake Ayamaru. The total population is around 25,000 people spread across around 40 villages. They use Ayamaru which is a dialect of the Maybrat language in everyday life.

Social condition
This ethnic group lives from farming, fishing, and hunting wild animals around Lake Ayamaru. Hunted products such as birds of paradise are usually used as merchandise in exchange for cloth brought by traders from other ethnic groups. The main kinship group is the nuclear family, in which the new couple creates their own home immediately after mating. The principle of kinship is bilateral. At present many Ayamaru people have embraced Christianity.

The settlement of the Ayamaru people has developed since the Dutch colonial in West New Guinea. One of the proofs is that there are clean water facilities that are well managed. According to local residents, Soekarno once visited the Ayamaru residential area and settled in a house which was later used as a cultural heritage. Even the elderly residents still remember the glory of this lake as one of the entrance gates for similar amphibious air transportation facilities de Havilland Canada DHC-2 Beaver.

Notable peoples
Boaz Solossa, Indonesian footballer
Dance Kambu, Indonesian footballer
Lamberthus Jitmau, Indonesian politician
Nehemia Solossa, Indonesian footballer
Ricky Kambuaya, Indonesian footballer
Ortizan Solossa, Indonesian footballer

References

Ethnic groups in Indonesia
Papuan people